The Belgorod constituency (No.75) is a Russian legislative constituency in Belgorod Oblast. The constituency covers western Belgorod Oblast, including its capital — Belgorod.

Members elected

Election results

1993

|-
! colspan=2 style="background-color:#E9E9E9;text-align:left;vertical-align:top;" |Candidate
! style="background-color:#E9E9E9;text-align:left;vertical-align:top;" |Party
! style="background-color:#E9E9E9;text-align:right;" |Votes
! style="background-color:#E9E9E9;text-align:right;" |%
|-
|style="background-color:"|
|align=left|Viktor Berestovoy
|align=left|Independent
|
|42.46%
|-
|style="background-color:#0085BE"|
|align=left|Igor Ivanov
|align=left|Choice of Russia
| -
|14.91%
|-
| colspan="5" style="background-color:#E9E9E9;"|
|- style="font-weight:bold"
| colspan="3" style="text-align:left;" | Total
| 
| 100%
|-
| colspan="5" style="background-color:#E9E9E9;"|
|- style="font-weight:bold"
| colspan="4" |Source:
|
|}

1995

|-
! colspan=2 style="background-color:#E9E9E9;text-align:left;vertical-align:top;" |Candidate
! style="background-color:#E9E9E9;text-align:left;vertical-align:top;" |Party
! style="background-color:#E9E9E9;text-align:right;" |Votes
! style="background-color:#E9E9E9;text-align:right;" |%
|-
|style="background-color:"|
|align=left|Nikolay Ryzhkov
|align=left|Power to the People
|
|50.94%
|-
|style="background-color:"|
|align=left|Ivan Miroshnichenko
|align=left|Our Home – Russia
|
|7.52%
|-
|style="background-color:"|
|align=left|Yury Gabelkov
|align=left|Liberal Democratic Party
|
|5.87%
|-
|style="background-color:"|
|align=left|Vasily Bessmertny
|align=left|Independent
|
|5.07%
|-
|style="background-color:#2C299A"|
|align=left|Gennady Bukhalin
|align=left|Congress of Russian Communities
|
|4.66%
|-
|style="background-color:#FE4801"|
|align=left|Viktor Kornev
|align=left|Pamfilova–Gurov–Lysenko
|
|3.52%
|-
|style="background-color:#1C1A0D"|
|align=left|Vladimir Abelmazov
|align=left|Forward, Russia!
|
|2.77%
|-
|style="background-color:#959698"|
|align=left|Vladimir Vetkov
|align=left|Derzhava
|
|2.70%
|-
|style="background-color:#019CDC"|
|align=left|Aleksandr Belyakov
|align=left|Party of Russian Unity and Accord
|
|1.70%
|-
|style="background-color:#000000"|
|colspan=2 |against all
|
|13.21%
|-
| colspan="5" style="background-color:#E9E9E9;"|
|- style="font-weight:bold"
| colspan="3" style="text-align:left;" | Total
| 
| 100%
|-
| colspan="5" style="background-color:#E9E9E9;"|
|- style="font-weight:bold"
| colspan="4" |Source:
|
|}

1999

|-
! colspan=2 style="background-color:#E9E9E9;text-align:left;vertical-align:top;" |Candidate
! style="background-color:#E9E9E9;text-align:left;vertical-align:top;" |Party
! style="background-color:#E9E9E9;text-align:right;" |Votes
! style="background-color:#E9E9E9;text-align:right;" |%
|-
|style="background-color:"|
|align=left|Nikolay Ryzhkov (incumbent)
|align=left|Independent
|
|51.66%
|-
|style="background-color:"|
|align=left|Olga Kitova
|align=left|Independent
|
|12.63%
|-
|style="background:"| 
|align=left|Yevgeny Gasho
|align=left|Yabloko
|
|10.50%
|-
|style="background-color:"|
|align=left|Aleksandr Goncharov
|align=left|Independent
|
|8.74%
|-
|style="background-color:"|
|align=left|Valery Varganov
|align=left|Our Home – Russia
|
|3.49%
|-
|style="background-color:#000000"|
|colspan=2 |against all
|
|10.21%
|-
| colspan="5" style="background-color:#E9E9E9;"|
|- style="font-weight:bold"
| colspan="3" style="text-align:left;" | Total
| 
| 100%
|-
| colspan="5" style="background-color:#E9E9E9;"|
|- style="font-weight:bold"
| colspan="4" |Source:
|
|}

2003

|-
! colspan=2 style="background-color:#E9E9E9;text-align:left;vertical-align:top;" |Candidate
! style="background-color:#E9E9E9;text-align:left;vertical-align:top;" |Party
! style="background-color:#E9E9E9;text-align:right;" |Votes
! style="background-color:#E9E9E9;text-align:right;" |%
|-
|style="background-color:"|
|align=left|Georgy Golikov
|align=left|Independent
|
|65.54%
|-
|style="background-color:"|
|align=left|Vasily Altukhov
|align=left|Communist Party
|
|17.97%
|-
|style="background-color:"|
|align=left|Aleksandr Lityuk
|align=left|Liberal Democratic Party
|
|2.19%
|-
|style="background-color:#164C8C"|
|align=left|Yevgeny Zaytsev
|align=left|United Russian Party Rus'
|
|1.69%
|-
|style="background-color:"|
|align=left|Boris Belogurov
|align=left|Independent
|
|1.25%
|-
|style="background-color:#000000"|
|colspan=2 |against all
|
|9.56%
|-
| colspan="5" style="background-color:#E9E9E9;"|
|- style="font-weight:bold"
| colspan="3" style="text-align:left;" | Total
| 
| 100%
|-
| colspan="5" style="background-color:#E9E9E9;"|
|- style="font-weight:bold"
| colspan="4" |Source:
|
|}

2016

|-
! colspan=2 style="background-color:#E9E9E9;text-align:left;vertical-align:top;" |Candidate
! style="background-color:#E9E9E9;text-align:leftt;vertical-align:top;" |Party
! style="background-color:#E9E9E9;text-align:right;" |Votes
! style="background-color:#E9E9E9;text-align:right;" |%
|-
| style="background-color: " |
|align=left|Sergey Bozhenov
|align=left|United Russia
|
|52.87%
|-
|style="background-color:"|
|align=left|Yury Selivanov
|align=left|A Just Russia
|
|12.28%
|-
|style="background-color:"|
|align=left|Valery Shevlyakov
|align=left|Communist Party
|
|9.76%
|-
|style="background-color:"|
|align=left|Aleksandr Starovoytov
|align=left|Liberal Democratic Party
|
|9.59%
|-
|style="background:"| 
|align=left|Ruslan Khoroshilov
|align=left|Communists of Russia
|
|5.04%
|-
|style="background:"| 
|align=left|Natalia Chernyshova
|align=left|Civic Platform
|
|2.98%
|-
|style="background-color:"|
|align=left|Vera Porkhun
|align=left|The Greens
|
|2.34%
|-
|style="background-color:"|
|align=left|Andrey Svishchyov
|align=left|Rodina
|
|2.24%
|-
| colspan="5" style="background-color:#E9E9E9;"|
|- style="font-weight:bold"
| colspan="3" style="text-align:left;" | Total
| 
| 100%
|-
| colspan="5" style="background-color:#E9E9E9;"|
|- style="font-weight:bold"
| colspan="4" |Source:
|
|}

2021

|-
! colspan=2 style="background-color:#E9E9E9;text-align:left;vertical-align:top;" |Candidate
! style="background-color:#E9E9E9;text-align:left;vertical-align:top;" |Party
! style="background-color:#E9E9E9;text-align:right;" |Votes
! style="background-color:#E9E9E9;text-align:right;" |%
|-
|style="background-color: " |
|align=left|Valery Skrug
|align=left|United Russia
|
|47.61%
|-
|style="background-color:"|
|align=left|Stanislav Panov
|align=left|Communist Party
|
|15.53%
|-
|style="background-color:"|
|align=left|Yury Osetrov
|align=left|A Just Russia — For Truth
|
|8.21%
|-
|style="background-color: "|
|align=left|Kristina Larina
|align=left|New People
|
|7.83%
|-
|style="background-color: "|
|align=left|Vladimir Androsov
|align=left|Party of Pensioners
|
|7.26%
|-
|style="background-color:"|
|align=left|Sergey Barinov
|align=left|Liberal Democratic Party
|
|5.53%
|-
|style="background-color:"|
|align=left|Yevgeny Bilichenko
|align=left|The Greens
|
|2.81%
|-
|style="background-color:"|
|align=left|Sergey Yeskov
|align=left|Rodina
|
|1.84%
|-
| colspan="5" style="background-color:#E9E9E9;"|
|- style="font-weight:bold"
| colspan="3" style="text-align:left;" | Total
| 
| 100%
|-
| colspan="5" style="background-color:#E9E9E9;"|
|- style="font-weight:bold"
| colspan="4" |Source:
|
|}

Notes

References

Russian legislative constituencies
Politics of Belgorod Oblast